The Stone Bridge is a bridge across the Vardar River in Skopje, the capital of the Republic of North Macedonia. The bridge is also less frequently known as the Dušan Bridge (Macedonian and Serbian: Душанов мост) after Stephen Dušan, Emperor of Serbia.

The bridge is considered a symbol of Skopje and is the main element of the coat of arms of the city, which in turn is incorporated in the city's flag. It is located in Centar municipality and it connects Macedonia Square to the Old Bazaar.

Architecture

The Stone Bridge is built of solid stone blocks and is supported by firm columns that are connected with 12 semicircular arcs. The guardhouse has recently been reconstructed.

History

The current Stone Bridge was built on Roman foundations under the patronage of Sultan Mehmed II the Conqueror between 1451 and 1469. Most of the Stone Bridge originates from the Ottoman period and throughout the centuries, the Stone Bridge was often damaged and then repaired. There is historical evidence that it once suffered during the great earthquake of 1555 which heavily damaged or destroyed four pillars. Renovations were carried out the same year. Some executions have also taken place on this bridge, such as the execution of Karposh in 1689.

In 1944, explosives were placed on the bridge by Nazis. Upon a request from city notables, the Germans gave up at the last minute and the bridge was saved from destruction. The last reconstruction of the bridge began in 1994. Over seven years during the Stone Bridge refurbishment of the 1990s, people were not allowed to cross the structure and for many craftsmen from the nearby Old Bazaar it resulted in negative economic effects. The watchtower shaped like a mihrab was reconstructed in 2008.

Two parts of Skopje that have symbolised its urban contrasts of "Ottoman" or "modern", the "historic" or "socialist", "Albanian" or "Macedonian" are split by the river Vardar and linked by the Stone Bridge. In the twenty first century, members of the majority and minority groups of the capital city view the stone bridge as representing the split between two parts of Skopje.

Gallery

See also
Ottoman architecture

References

Bridges completed in 1469
Bridges in Skopje
Pedestrian bridges in North Macedonia
Ottoman bridges in North Macedonia
Stone arch bridges
Old Bazaar, Skopje